Redbridge Cycling Centre is a road cycle circuit and mountain bike course at Hog Hill – near Hainault Forest Country Park and directly opposite the Forest Cemetery and Crematorium. The £5m cost of the facility was funded by the London Development Agency (LDA) as a replacement the former Eastway cycle facilities that were redeveloped for the London Olympic Park. The LDA funded the facility up to the completion of the legacy London Velopark. It was opened by Boris Johnson in August 2008.

In 2014, Redbridge Council agreed to purchase Redbridge Cycling Centre from the Crown Estate using a grant from the London Marathon Charitable Trust.

See also
 Crystal Palace (circuit)
 Betteshanger Park
 Hillingdon Cycle Circuit
 Cyclopark

References

External links
 Redbridge Cycle Centre on the Redbridge Borough Council web site
 Redbridge Cycle Centre web site
 Redbridge Cycle Circuit details at British Cycling

Sport in the London Borough of Redbridge
Cycle racing in London
Sports venues in London
BMX tracks
Mountain biking venues in the United Kingdom
Sports venues completed in 2008
2008 establishments in England